Parapercis clathrata, the latticed sandperch, is a fish species in the sandperch family, Pinguipedidae. It is found throughout the Indo-West Pacific. From India and Sri Lanka to Tonga.

References

Randall, J.E., G.R. Allen and R.C. Steene, 1990. Fishes of the Great Barrier Reef and Coral Sea. University of Hawaii Press, Honolulu, Hawaii. 506 p. 

Pinguipedidae

Fish described in 1910
Fish of the Pacific Ocean
Taxa named by William Ogilby